Malcolm Winkler is an American biologist currently at Indiana University, Bloomington and an Elected Fellow of the American Association for the Advancement of Science. His work has been important on Streptococcus pneumoniae in studying cell structure, metabolism, pathogenesis and stress responses mediated by regulatory mechanisms, signal transduction and supramolecular complexes. His research has been driven by advanced molecular genetics, cell biology, physiology, tissue culture and biochemistry, leading his papers to be highly cited in consecutive years with highs of 719, 369 and 292.

References

Year of birth missing (living people)
Living people
Fellows of the American Association for the Advancement of Science
21st-century American biologists
Indiana University Bloomington faculty
Johns Hopkins University alumni
Stanford University alumni